Kubilay Aktaş (born 29 January 1995) is a Turkish footballer who plays as a midfielder for Altınordu.

Club career
He made his Süper Lig debut on 6 October 2013.

International career
Aktaş represented Turkish national under-19 team at the 2013 Mediterranean Games.

References

 4 Futbolcu ille yollarini ayirdi, bolugundem.com, 3 January 2016

External links
 
 

1995 births
Sportspeople from Lyon Metropolis
Footballers from Auvergne-Rhône-Alpes
French people of Turkish descent
Living people
Turkish footballers
Turkey youth international footballers
French footballers
Association football midfielders
Kasımpaşa S.K. footballers
Boluspor footballers
İstanbulspor footballers
Gaziantep F.K. footballers
Denizlispor footballers
Manisa FK footballers
Altınordu F.K. players
Süper Lig players
TFF First League players
TFF Second League players
Mediterranean Games silver medalists for Turkey
Mediterranean Games medalists in football
Competitors at the 2013 Mediterranean Games